Pateh Khvor (also Romanized as Pateh Khowr) is a village in Vilkij-e Shomali Rural District, in the Central District of Namin County, Ardabil Province, Iran. At the 2006 census, its population was 414, in 85 families.

References 

Towns and villages in Namin County